Camopi Airport (sometimes called Vila Brasil Airport)  is an airport serving the Oyapock river village of Camopi, French Guiana near the border with Brazil.

The airport is at the confluence of the Camopi into the Oyapock, adjacent to the Camopi encampment of the 3rd Foreign Infantry Regiment of the French Foreign Legion.

The Camopi non-directional beacon (Ident: CP) is located just south of the runway.

In October 2020, the airport was upgraded for regular passenger transport. The airport opened for regular service in April 2021.

Airlines and destinations

See also

Transport in French Guiana
List of airports in French Guiana

References

External links
OpenStreetMap - Camopi
FallingRain - Vila Brasil Airport

Airports in French Guiana
Buildings and structures in Camopi